Eucalyptus melanoxylon, commonly known as black morrell, is a species of small to medium-sized tree that is endemic to Western Australia. It has hard, fissured bark on some or all of its trunk, linear to narrow lance-shaped leaves, flower buds in groups of between seven and fifteen, white flowers and conical to cup-shaped fruit.

Description
It has hard, thick, fissured bark on the trunk and larger branches or sometimes only on the lower half, and white to greyish bark above. Flowering occurs between November and March and the flowers are white.

Taxonomy
Eucalyptus melanoxylon was first formally described in 1923 by Joseph Maiden in his book, A Critical Revision of the Genus Eucalyptus from specimens collected near Westonia. The specific epithet (melanoxylon) means "black wood", alluding to the very dark colour of the timber.

Distribution and habitat
Black morrell occurs in southern Western Australia from Westonia, Bullabulling and Lake King in the eastern wheatbelt to Balladonia in the eastern goldfields. It is found in depressions and on flats where it grows in sand-clay-loamy soils.

Conservation status
This eucalypt is classified as "not threatened" by the Western Australian Government Department of Parks and Wildlife.

Uses
The heartwood of this species is a dark brown colour with visible growth rings. It is quite workable and is suitable for woodturning, sanding and finishing.

See also
List of Eucalyptus species

References

Eucalypts of Western Australia
Trees of Australia
melanoxylon
Myrtales of Australia
Plants described in 1923
Taxa named by Joseph Maiden